Hirofumi Sakai (born February 10, 1965) is a retired Japanese male race walker. He competed for Japan at the 1988 Summer Olympics.

International competitions

References

sports-reference

1965 births
Living people
Japanese male racewalkers
Olympic male racewalkers
Olympic athletes of Japan
Athletes (track and field) at the 1988 Summer Olympics
Asian Games silver medalists for Japan
Asian Games medalists in athletics (track and field)
Athletes (track and field) at the 1990 Asian Games
Athletes (track and field) at the 1994 Asian Games
Medalists at the 1990 Asian Games
World Athletics Championships athletes for Japan
Asian Athletics Championships winners
Japan Championships in Athletics winners
20th-century Japanese people
21st-century Japanese people